In organic chemistry, an alkane, or paraffin (a historical trivial name that also has other meanings), is an acyclic saturated hydrocarbon. In other words, an alkane consists of hydrogen and carbon atoms arranged in a tree structure in which all the carbon–carbon bonds are single. Alkanes have the general chemical formula . The alkanes range in complexity from the simplest case of methane, where n = 1 (sometimes called the parent molecule), to arbitrarily large and complex molecules, like pentacontane or 6-ethyl-2-methyl-5-(1-methylethyl) octane, an isomer of tetradecane.

The International Union of Pure and Applied Chemistry (IUPAC) defines alkanes as "acyclic branched or unbranched hydrocarbons having the general formula , and therefore consisting entirely of hydrogen atoms and saturated carbon atoms". However, some sources use the term to denote any saturated hydrocarbon, including those that are either monocyclic (i.e. the cycloalkanes) or polycyclic, despite their having a distinct general formula (i.e. cycloalkanes are ).

In an alkane, each carbon atom is sp3-hybridized with 4 sigma bonds (either C–C or C–H), and each hydrogen atom is joined to one of the carbon atoms (in a C–H bond). The longest series of linked carbon atoms in a molecule is known as its carbon skeleton or carbon backbone. The number of carbon atoms may be considered as the size of the alkane.

One group of the higher alkanes are waxes, solids at standard ambient temperature and pressure (SATP), for which the number of carbon atoms in the carbon backbone is greater than about 17.
With their repeated – units, the alkanes constitute a homologous series of organic compounds in which the members differ in molecular mass by multiples of 14.03 u (the total mass of each such methylene-bridge unit, which comprises a single carbon atom of mass 12.01 u and two hydrogen atoms of mass ~1.01 u each).

Methane is produced by methanogenic bacteria and some long-chain alkanes function as pheromones in certain animal species or as protective waxes in plants and fungi. Nevertheless, most alkanes do not have much biological activity.  They can be viewed as molecular trees upon which can be hung the more active/reactive functional groups of biological molecules.

The alkanes have two main commercial sources: petroleum (crude oil) and natural gas.

An alkyl group is an alkane-based molecular fragment that bears one open valence for bonding. They are generally abbreviated with the symbol for any organyl group, R, although Alk is sometimes used to specifically symbolize an alkyl group (as opposed to an alkenyl group or aryl group).

Structure and classification
Saturated hydrocarbons can be linear, branched, or cyclic. The third group is sometimes called cycloalkanes. Very complicated structures are possible by combining linear, branch, cyclic alkanes.

Isomerism

Alkanes with more than three carbon atoms can be arranged in various ways, forming structural isomers. The simplest isomer of an alkane is the one in which the carbon atoms are arranged in a single chain with no branches. This isomer is sometimes called the n-isomer (n for "normal", although it is not necessarily the most common). However, the chain of carbon atoms may also be branched at one or more points. The number of possible isomers increases rapidly with the number of carbon atoms. For example, for acyclic alkanes:
 C1: methane only
 C2: ethane only
 C3: propane only
 C4: 2 isomers: butane and isobutane
 C5: 3 isomers: pentane, isopentane, and neopentane
 C6: 5 isomers: hexane, 2-methylpentane, 3-methylpentane, 2,2-dimethylbutane, and 2,3-dimethylbutane
 C7: 9 isomers: heptane, methylhexane (2 isomers), dimethylpentane (4 isomers), 3-ethylpentane, 2,2,3-trimethylbutane
C8: 18 isomers: octane, 2-methylheptane, 3-methylheptane, 2,3-dimethylhexane, 3,4-dimethylhexane,  2,3,4-trimethylpentane, 3,3-dimethylhexane, 2,2-trimethylpentane, 2,4-dimethylhexane, 2,2,4-trimethylpentane, 2,3,3-Trimethylpentane, 3,3,4-trimethyl-pentane, 3,4,4-trimethylpentane, 2,4,4-trimethylpentane, (5 isomers)
 C9: 35 isomers
 C10: 75 isomers
 C12: 355 isomers
 C32: 27,711,253,769 isomers
 C60: 22,158,734,535,770,411,074,184 isomers, many of which are not stable

Branched alkanes can be chiral. For example, 3-methylhexane and its higher homologues are chiral due to their stereogenic center at carbon atom number 3. The above list only includes differences of connectivity, not stereochemistry. In addition to the alkane isomers, the chain of carbon atoms may form one or more rings. Such compounds are called cycloalkanes, and are also excluded from the above list because changing the number of rings changes the molecular formula. For example, cyclobutane and methylcyclopropane are isomers of each other (C4H8), but are not isomers of butane (C4H10).

Nomenclature

The IUPAC nomenclature (systematic way of naming compounds) for alkanes is based on identifying hydrocarbon chains. Unbranched, saturated hydrocarbon chains are named systematically with a Greek numerical prefix denoting the number of carbons and the suffix "-ane".

In 1866, August Wilhelm von Hofmann suggested systematizing nomenclature by using the whole sequence of vowels a, e, i, o and u to create suffixes -ane, -ene, -ine (or -yne), -one, -une, for the hydrocarbons CnH2n+2, CnH2n, CnH2n−2, CnH2n−4, CnH2n−6. In modern nomenclature, the first three specifically name hydrocarbons with single, double and triple bonds; while "-one" now represents a ketone.

Linear alkanes

Straight-chain alkanes are sometimes indicated by the prefix "n-" or "n-"(for "normal") where a non-linear isomer exists. Although this is not strictly necessary and is not part of the IUPAC naming system, the usage is still common in cases where one wishes to emphasize or distinguish between the straight-chain and branched-chain isomers, e.g., "n-butane" rather than simply "butane" to differentiate it from isobutane. Alternative names for this group used in the petroleum industry are linear paraffins or n-paraffins.

The first six members of the series (in terms of number of carbon atoms) are named as follows:
 methane CH4 – one carbon and 4 hydrogen
 ethane  C2H6 – two carbon and 6 hydrogen
 propane C3H8 – three carbon and 8 hydrogen
 butane  C4H10 – four carbon and 10 hydrogen
 pentane C5H12 – five carbon and 12 hydrogen
 hexane  C6H14 – six carbon and 14 hydrogen

The first four names were derived from methanol, ether, propionic acid and butyric acid. Alkanes with five or more carbon atoms are named by adding the suffix -ane to the appropriate numerical multiplier prefix with elision of any terminal vowel (-a or -o) from the basic numerical term. Hence, pentane, C5H12; hexane, C6H14; heptane, C7H16; octane, C8H18; etc. The numeral prefix is generally Greek; however, alkanes with a carbon atom count ending in nine, for example nonane, use the Latin prefix non-. For a more complete list, see list of straight-chain alkanes.

Branched alkanes

Simple branched alkanes often have a common name using a prefix to distinguish them from linear alkanes, for example n-pentane, isopentane, and neopentane.

IUPAC naming conventions can be used to produce a systematic name.

The key steps in the naming of more complicated branched alkanes are as follows:
 Identify the longest continuous chain of carbon atoms
 Name this longest root chain using standard naming rules
 Name each side chain by changing the suffix of the name of the alkane from "-ane" to "-yl"
 Number the longest continuous chain in order to give the lowest possible numbers for the side-chains
 Number and name the side chains before the name of the root chain
 If there are multiple side chains of the same type, use prefixes such as "di-" and "tri-" to indicate it as such, and number each one.
 Add side chain names in alphabetical (disregarding "di-" etc. prefixes) order in front of the name of the root chain

Saturated cyclic hydrocarbons

Though technically distinct from the alkanes, this class of hydrocarbons is referred to by some as the "cyclic alkanes." As their description implies, they contain one or more rings.

Simple cycloalkanes have a prefix "cyclo-" to distinguish them from alkanes. Cycloalkanes are named as per their acyclic counterparts with respect to the number of carbon atoms in their backbones, e.g., cyclopentane (C5H10) is a cycloalkane with 5 carbon atoms just like pentane (C5H12), but they are joined up in a five-membered ring. In a similar manner, propane and cyclopropane, butane and cyclobutane, etc.

Substituted cycloalkanes are named similarly to substituted alkanes – the cycloalkane ring is stated, and the substituents are according to their position on the ring, with the numbering decided by the Cahn–Ingold–Prelog priority rules.

Trivial/common names

The trivial (non-systematic) name for alkanes is 'paraffins'. Together, alkanes are known as the 'paraffin series'. Trivial names for compounds are usually historical artifacts. They were coined before the development of systematic names, and have been retained due to familiar usage in industry. Cycloalkanes are also called naphthenes.

Branched-chain alkanes are called isoparaffins. "Paraffin" is a general term and often does not distinguish between pure compounds and mixtures of isomers, i.e., compounds of the same chemical formula, e.g., pentane and isopentane.

In IUPAC
The following trivial names are retained in the IUPAC system:
 isobutane for 2-methylpropane
 isopentane for 2-methylbutane
 neopentane for 2,2-dimethylpropane.

Non-IUPAC
Some non-IUPAC trivial names are occasionally used:
 cetane, for hexadecane
 cerane, for hexacosane

Physical properties

All alkanes are colorless. Alkanes with the lowest molecular weights are gases, those of intermediate molecular weight are liquids, and the heaviest are waxy solids.

Table of alkanes

Boiling point

Alkanes experience intermolecular van der Waals forces. Stronger intermolecular van der Waals forces give rise to greater boiling points of alkanes.

There are two determinants for the strength of the van der Waals forces:
 the number of electrons surrounding the molecule, which increases with the alkane's molecular weight
 the surface area of the molecule

Under standard conditions, from CH4 to C4H10 alkanes are gaseous; from C5H12 to C17H36 they are liquids; and after C18H38 they are solids. As the boiling point of alkanes is primarily determined by weight, it should not be a surprise that the boiling point has an almost linear relationship with the size (molecular weight) of the molecule. As a rule of thumb, the boiling point rises 20–30 °C for each carbon added to the chain; this rule applies to other homologous series.

A straight-chain alkane will have a boiling point higher than a branched-chain alkane due to the greater surface area in contact, and thus greater van der Waals forces, between adjacent molecules. For example, compare isobutane (2-methylpropane) and n-butane (butane), which boil at −12 and 0 °C, and 2,2-dimethylbutane and 2,3-dimethylbutane which boil at 50 and 58 °C, respectively. 

On the other hand, cycloalkanes tend to have higher boiling points than their linear counterparts due to the locked conformations of the molecules, which give a plane of intermolecular contact.

Melting points
The melting points of the alkanes follow a similar trend to boiling points for the same reason as outlined above. That is, (all other things being equal) the larger the molecule the higher the melting point. There is one significant difference between boiling points and melting points. Solids have a more rigid and fixed structure than liquids. This rigid structure requires energy to break down. Thus the better put together solid structures will require more energy to break apart. For alkanes, this can be seen from the graph above (i.e., the blue line). The odd-numbered alkanes have a lower trend in melting points than even-numbered alkanes. This is because even-numbered alkanes pack well in the solid phase, forming a well-organized structure which requires more energy to break apart. The odd-numbered alkanes pack less well and so the "looser"-organized solid packing structure requires less energy to break apart. For a visualization of the crystal structures see.

The melting points of branched-chain alkanes can be either higher or lower than those of the corresponding straight-chain alkanes, again depending on the ability of the alkane in question to pack well in the solid phase.

Conductivity and solubility
Alkanes do not conduct electricity in any way, nor are they substantially polarized by an electric field. For this reason, they do not form hydrogen bonds and are insoluble in polar solvents such as water. Since the hydrogen bonds between individual water molecules are aligned away from an alkane molecule, the coexistence of an alkane and water leads to an increase in molecular order (a reduction in entropy). As there is no significant bonding between water molecules and alkane molecules, the second law of thermodynamics suggests that this reduction in entropy should be minimized by minimizing the contact between alkane and water: Alkanes are said to be hydrophobic as they are insoluble in water.

Their solubility in nonpolar solvents is relatively high, a property that is called lipophilicity. Alkanes are, for example, miscible in all proportions among themselves.

The density of the alkanes usually increases with the number of carbon atoms but remains less than that of water. Hence, alkanes form the upper layer in an alkane–water mixture.

Molecular geometry

The molecular structure of the alkanes directly affects their physical and chemical characteristics. It is derived from the electron configuration of carbon, which has four valence electrons. The carbon atoms in alkanes are described as sp3 hybrids; that is to say that, to a good approximation, the valence electrons are in orbitals directed towards the corners of a tetrahedron which are derived from the combination of the 2s orbital and the three 2p orbitals. Geometrically, the angle between the bonds are cos−1(−) ≈ 109.47°. This is exact for the case of methane, while larger alkanes containing a combination of C–H and C–C bonds generally have bonds that are within several degrees of this idealized value.

Bond lengths and bond angles

An alkane has only C–H and C–C single bonds. The former result from the overlap of an sp3 orbital of carbon with the 1s orbital of a hydrogen; the latter by the overlap of two sp3 orbitals on adjacent carbon atoms. The bond lengths amount to 1.09 × 10−10 m for a C–H bond and 1.54 × 10−10 m for a C–C bond.

The spatial arrangement of the bonds is similar to that of the four sp3 orbitals—they are tetrahedrally arranged, with an angle of 109.47° between them. Structural formulae that represent the bonds as being at right angles to one another, while both common and useful, do not accurately depict the geometry.

Conformation

The structural formula and the bond angles are not usually sufficient to completely describe the geometry of a molecule. There is a further degree of freedom for each carbon–carbon bond: the torsion angle between the atoms or groups bound to the atoms at each end of the bond. The spatial arrangement described by the torsion angles of the molecule is known as its conformation.

Ethane forms the simplest case for studying the conformation of alkanes, as there is only one C–C bond. If one looks down the axis of the C–C bond, one will see the so-called Newman projection. The hydrogen atoms on both the front and rear carbon atoms have an angle of 120° between them, resulting from the projection of the base of the tetrahedron onto a flat plane. However, the torsion angle between a given hydrogen atom attached to the front carbon and a given hydrogen atom attached to the rear carbon can vary freely between 0° and 360°. This is a consequence of the free rotation about a carbon–carbon single bond. Despite this apparent freedom, only two limiting conformations are important: eclipsed conformation and staggered conformation.

The two conformations differ in energy: the staggered conformation is 12.6 kJ/mol (3.0 kcal/mol) lower in energy (more stable) than the eclipsed conformation (the least stable).

This difference in energy between the two conformations, known as the torsion energy, is low compared to the thermal energy of an ethane molecule at ambient temperature. There is constant rotation about the C–C bond. The time taken for an ethane molecule to pass from one staggered conformation to the next, equivalent to the rotation of one CH3 group by 120° relative to the other, is of the order of 10−11 seconds.

The case of higher alkanes is more complex but based on similar principles, with the antiperiplanar conformation always being the most favored around each carbon–carbon bond. For this reason, alkanes are usually shown in a zigzag arrangement in diagrams or in models. The actual structure will always differ somewhat from these idealized forms, as the differences in energy between the conformations are small compared to the thermal energy of the molecules: Alkane molecules have no fixed structural form, whatever the models may suggest.

Spectroscopic properties

Virtually all organic compounds contain carbon–carbon and carbon–hydrogen bonds, and so show some of the features of alkanes in their spectra. Alkanes are notable for having no other groups, and therefore for the absence of other characteristic spectroscopic features of a functional group like –OH, –CHO, –COOH, etc.

Infrared spectroscopy
The carbon–hydrogen stretching mode gives a strong absorption between 2850 and 2960 cm−1, while the carbon–carbon stretching mode absorbs between 800 and 1300 cm−1. The carbon–hydrogen bending modes depend on the nature of the group: methyl groups show bands at 1450 cm−1 and 1375 cm−1, while methylene groups show bands at 1465 cm−1 and 1450 cm−1. Carbon chains with more than four carbon atoms show a weak absorption at around 725 cm−1.

NMR spectroscopy
The proton resonances of alkanes are usually found at δH = 0.5–1.5. The carbon-13 resonances depend on the number of hydrogen atoms attached to the carbon: δC = 8–30 (primary, methyl, –CH3), 15–55 (secondary, methylene, –CH2–), 20–60 (tertiary, methyne, C–H) and quaternary. The carbon-13 resonance of quaternary carbon atoms is characteristically weak, due to the lack of nuclear Overhauser effect and the long relaxation time, and can be missed in weak samples, or samples that have not been run for a sufficiently long time.

Mass spectrometry
Alkanes have a high ionization energy, and the molecular ion is usually weak. The fragmentation pattern can be difficult to interpret, but in the case of branched chain alkanes, the carbon chain is preferentially cleaved at tertiary or quaternary carbons due to the relative stability of the resulting free radicals. The fragment resulting from the loss of a single methyl group (M − 15) is often absent, and other fragments are often spaced by intervals of fourteen mass units, corresponding to sequential loss of CH2 groups.

Chemical properties

Alkanes are only weakly reactive with most chemical compounds. The acid dissociation constant (pKa) values of all alkanes are estimated to range from 50 to 70, depending on the extrapolation method, hence they are extremely weak acids that are practically inert to bases (see: carbon acids). They are also extremely weak bases, undergoing no observable protonation in pure sulfuric acid (H0 ~ −12), although superacids that are at least millions of times stronger have been known to protonate them to give hypercoordinate alkanium ions (see: methanium ion). Similarly, they only show reactivity with the strongest of electrophilic reagents (e.g., dioxiranes and salts containing the NF4+ cation). By virtue of their strong C–H bonds (~100 kcal/mol) and C–C bonds (~90 kcal/mol, but usually less sterically accessible), they are also relatively unreactive toward free radicals, although many electron-deficient radicals will react with alkanes in the absence of other electron-rich bonds (see below). This inertness is the source of the term paraffins (with the meaning here of "lacking affinity"). In crude oil the alkane molecules have remained chemically unchanged for millions of years.

Free radicals, molecules with unpaired electrons, play a large role in most reactions of alkanes, such as cracking and reformation where long-chain alkanes are converted into shorter-chain alkanes and straight-chain alkanes into branched-chain isomers. Moreover, redox reactions of alkanes involving free radical intermediates, in particular with oxygen and the halogens, are possible as the carbon atoms are in a strongly reduced state; in the case of methane, carbon is in its lowest possible oxidation state (−4). Reaction with oxygen (if present in sufficient quantity to satisfy the reaction stoichiometry) leads to combustion without any smoke, producing carbon dioxide and water. Free radical halogenation reactions occur with halogens, leading to the production of haloalkanes. In addition, alkanes have been shown to interact with, and bind to, certain transition metal complexes in C–H bond activation reactions.

In highly branched alkanes, the bond angle may differ significantly from the optimal value (109.5°) to accommodate bulky groups. Such distortions introduce a tension in the molecule, known as steric hindrance or strain. Strain substantially increases reactivity.

However, in general and perhaps surprisingly, when branching is not extensive enough to make highly disfavorable 1,2- and 1,3-alkyl–alkyl steric interactions (worth ~3.1 kcal/mol and ~3.7 kcal/mol in the case of the eclipsing conformations of butane and pentane, respectively) unavoidable, the branched alkanes are actually more thermodynamically stable than their linear (or less branched) isomers. For example, the highly branched 2,2,3,3-tetramethylbutane is about 1.9 kcal/mol more stable than its linear isomer, n-octane. Due to the subtlety of this effect, the exact reasons for this rule have been vigorously debated in the chemical literature and is yet unsettled. Several explanations, including stabilization of branched alkanes by electron correlation, destabilization of linear alkanes by steric repulsion, stabilization by neutral hyperconjugation, and/or electrostatic effects have been advanced as possibilities. The controversy is related to the question of whether the traditional explanation of hyperconjugation is the primary factor governing the stability of alkyl radicals.

Reactions with oxygen (combustion reaction)
All alkanes react with oxygen in a combustion reaction, although they become increasingly difficult to ignite as the number of carbon atoms increases. The general equation for complete combustion is:
CnH2n+2 + (n + ) O2 → (n + 1) H2O + n CO2
or CnH2n+2 + O2 → (n + 1) H2O + n CO2

In the absence of sufficient oxygen, carbon monoxide or even soot can be formed, as shown below:

CnH2n+2 + (n + ) O2 → (n + 1) H2O + n CO

CnH2n+2 + (n + ) O2 → (n + 1) H2O + n C

For example, methane:
2 CH4 + 3 O2 → 4 H2O + 2 CO
CH4 + O2 → 2 H2O + C

See the alkane heat of formation table for detailed data.
The standard enthalpy change of combustion, ΔcH⊖, for alkanes increases by about 650 kJ/mol per CH2 group. Branched-chain alkanes have lower values of ΔcH⊖ than straight-chain alkanes of the same number of carbon atoms, and so can be seen to be somewhat more stable.

Reactions with halogens 

Alkanes react with halogens in a so-called free radical halogenation reaction. The hydrogen atoms of the alkane are progressively replaced by halogen atoms. Free radicals are the reactive species that participate in the reaction, which usually leads to a mixture of products. The reaction is highly exothermic with halogen fluorine and can lead to an explosion.

These reactions are an important industrial route to halogenated hydrocarbons. There are three steps:
 Initiation the halogen radicals form by homolysis. Usually, energy in the form of heat or light is required.
 Chain reaction or Propagation then takes place—the halogen radical abstracts a hydrogen from the alkane to give an alkyl radical. This reacts further.
 Chain termination where the radicals recombine.

Experiments have shown that all halogenation produces a mixture of all possible isomers, indicating that all hydrogen atoms are susceptible to reaction. The mixture produced, however, is not a statistical mixture: Secondary and tertiary hydrogen atoms are preferentially replaced due to the greater stability of secondary and tertiary free-radicals. An example can be seen in the monobromination of propane:

Cracking 

Cracking breaks larger molecules into smaller ones. This can be done with a thermal or catalytic method. The thermal cracking process follows a homolytic mechanism with formation of free radicals. The catalytic cracking process involves the presence of acid catalysts (usually solid acids such as silica-alumina and zeolites), which promote a heterolytic (asymmetric) breakage of bonds yielding pairs of ions of opposite charges, usually a carbocation and the very unstable hydride anion. Carbon-localized free radicals and cations are both highly unstable and undergo processes of chain rearrangement, C–C scission in position beta (i.e., cracking) and intra- and intermolecular hydrogen transfer or hydride transfer. In both types of processes, the corresponding reactive intermediates (radicals, ions) are permanently regenerated, and thus they proceed by a self-propagating chain mechanism. The chain of reactions is eventually terminated by radical or ion recombination.

Isomerization and reformation 
Dragan and his colleague were the first to report about isomerization in alkanes. Isomerization and reformation are processes in which straight-chain alkanes are heated in the presence of a platinum catalyst. In isomerization, the alkanes become branched-chain isomers. In other words, it does not lose any carbons or hydrogens, keeping the same molecular weight. In reformation, the alkanes become cycloalkanes or aromatic hydrocarbons, giving off hydrogen as a by-product. Both of these processes raise the octane number of the substance. Butane is the most common alkane that is put under the process of isomerization, as it makes many branched alkanes with high octane numbers.

Other reactions
Alkanes will react with steam in the presence of a nickel catalyst to give hydrogen. Alkanes can be chlorosulfonated and nitrated, although both reactions require special conditions. The fermentation of alkanes to carboxylic acids is of some technical importance. In the Reed reaction, sulfur dioxide, chlorine and light convert hydrocarbons to sulfonyl chlorides. Nucleophilic abstraction can be used to separate an alkane from a metal. Alkyl groups can be transferred from one compound to another by transmetalation reactions. A mixture of antimony pentafluoride (SbF5) and fluorosulfonic acid (HSO3F), called magic acid, can protonate alkanes.

Occurrence

Occurrence of alkanes in the Universe

Alkanes form a small portion of the atmospheres of the outer gas planets such as Jupiter (0.1% methane, 2 ppm ethane), Saturn (0.2% methane, 5 ppm ethane), Uranus (1.99% methane, 2.5 ppm ethane) and Neptune (1.5% methane, 1.5 ppm ethane). Titan (1.6% methane), a satellite of Saturn, was examined by the Huygens probe, which indicated that Titan's atmosphere periodically rains liquid methane onto the moon's surface. Also on Titan, the Cassini mission has imaged seasonal methane/ethane lakes near the polar regions of Titan. Methane and ethane have also been detected in the tail of the comet Hyakutake. Chemical analysis showed that the abundances of ethane and methane were roughly equal, which is thought to imply that its ices formed in interstellar space, away from the Sun, which would have evaporated these volatile molecules. Alkanes have also been detected in meteorites such as carbonaceous chondrites.

Occurrence of alkanes on Earth
Traces of methane gas (about 0.0002% or 1745 ppb) occur in the Earth's atmosphere, produced primarily by methanogenic microorganisms, such as Archaea in the gut of ruminants.

The most important commercial sources for alkanes are natural gas and oil. Natural gas contains primarily methane and ethane, with some propane and butane: oil is a mixture of liquid alkanes and other hydrocarbons. These hydrocarbons were formed when marine animals and plants (zooplankton and phytoplankton) died and sank to the bottom of ancient seas and were covered with sediments in an anoxic environment and converted over many millions of years at high temperatures and high pressure to their current form. Natural gas resulted thereby for example from the following reaction:
C6H12O6 → 3 CH4 + 3 CO2

These hydrocarbon deposits, collected in porous rocks trapped beneath impermeable cap rocks, comprise commercial oil fields. They have formed over millions of years and once exhausted cannot be readily replaced. The depletion of these hydrocarbons reserves is the basis for what is known as the energy crisis.

Alkanes have a low solubility in water, so the content in the oceans is negligible; however, at high pressures and low temperatures (such as at the bottom of the oceans), methane can co-crystallize with water to form a solid methane clathrate (methane hydrate). Although this cannot be commercially exploited at the present time, the amount of combustible energy of the known methane clathrate fields exceeds the energy content of all the natural gas and oil deposits put together. Methane extracted from methane clathrate is, therefore, a candidate for future fuels.

Biological occurrence
Acyclic alkanes occur in nature in various ways. Methane is present in what is called biogas, produced by animals and decaying matter, which is a possible renewable energy source.

Bacteria and archaea

Certain types of bacteria can metabolize alkanes: they prefer even-numbered carbon chains as they are easier to degrade than odd-numbered chains.

On the other hand, certain archaea, the methanogens, produce large quantities of methane by the metabolism of carbon dioxide or other oxidized organic compounds. The energy is released by the oxidation of hydrogen:
CO2 + 4 H2 → CH4 + 2 H2O

Methanogens are also the producers of marsh gas in wetlands. The methane output of cattle and other herbivores, which can release 30 to 50 gallons per day, and of termites, is also due to methanogens. They also produce this simplest of all alkanes in the intestines of humans. Methanogenic archaea are, hence, at the end of the carbon cycle, with carbon being released back into the atmosphere after having been fixed by photosynthesis. It is probable that our current deposits of natural gas were formed in a similar way.

Fungi and plants
Alkanes also play a role, if a minor role, in the biology of the three eukaryotic groups of organisms: fungi, plants, and animals. Some specialized yeasts, e.g., Candida tropicale, Pichia sp., Rhodotorula sp., can use alkanes as a source of carbon or energy. The fungus Amorphotheca resinae prefers the longer-chain alkanes in aviation fuel, and can cause serious problems for aircraft in tropical regions.

In plants, the solid long-chain alkanes are found in the plant cuticle and epicuticular wax of many species, but are only rarely major constituents. They protect the plant against water loss, prevent the leaching of important minerals by the rain, and protect against bacteria, fungi, and harmful insects. The carbon chains in plant alkanes are usually odd-numbered, between 27 and 33 carbon atoms in length, and are made by the plants by decarboxylation of even-numbered fatty acids. The exact composition of the layer of wax is not only species-dependent but also changes with the season and such environmental factors as lighting conditions, temperature or humidity.

More volatile short-chain alkanes are also produced by and found in plant tissues. The Jeffrey pine is noted for producing exceptionally high levels of n-heptane in its resin, for which reason its distillate was designated as the zero point for one octane rating. Floral scents have also long been known to contain volatile alkane components, and n-nonane is a significant component in the scent of some roses. Emission of gaseous and volatile alkanes such as ethane, pentane, and hexane by plants has also been documented at low levels, though they are not generally considered to be a major component of biogenic air pollution.

Edible vegetable oils also typically contain small fractions of biogenic alkanes with a wide spectrum of carbon numbers, mainly 8 to 35, usually peaking in the low to upper 20s, with concentrations up to dozens of milligrams per kilogram (parts per million by weight) and sometimes over a hundred for the total alkane fraction.

Animals

Alkanes are found in animal products, although they are less important than unsaturated hydrocarbons. One example is the shark liver oil, which is approximately 14% pristane (2,6,10,14-tetramethylpentadecane, C19H40). They are important as pheromones, chemical messenger materials, on which insects depend for communication. In some species, e.g. the support beetle Xylotrechus colonus, pentacosane (C25H52), 3-methylpentaicosane (C26H54) and 9-methylpentaicosane (C26H54) are transferred by body contact. With others like the tsetse fly Glossina morsitans morsitans, the pheromone contains the four alkanes 2-methylheptadecane (C18H38), 17,21-dimethylheptatriacontane (C39H80), 15,19-dimethylheptatriacontane (C39H80) and 15,19,23-trimethylheptatriacontane (C40H82), and acts by smell over longer distances. Waggle-dancing honey bees produce and release two alkanes, tricosane and pentacosane.

Ecological relations

One example, in which both plant and animal alkanes play a role, is the ecological relationship between the sand bee (Andrena nigroaenea) and the early spider orchid (Ophrys sphegodes); the latter is dependent for pollination on the former. Sand bees use pheromones in order to identify a mate; in the case of A. nigroaenea, the females emit a mixture of tricosane (C23H48), pentacosane (C25H52) and heptacosane (C27H56) in the ratio 3:3:1, and males are attracted by specifically this odor. The orchid takes advantage of this mating arrangement to get the male bee to collect and disseminate its pollen; parts of its flower not only resemble the appearance of sand bees but also produce large quantities of the three alkanes in the same ratio as female sand bees. As a result, numerous males are lured to the blooms and attempt to copulate with their imaginary partner: although this endeavor is not crowned with success for the bee, it allows the orchid to transfer its pollen,
which will be dispersed after the departure of the frustrated male to other blooms.

Production

Petroleum refining

As stated earlier, the most important source of alkanes is natural gas and crude oil. Alkanes are separated in an oil refinery by fractional distillation and processed into many products.

Fischer–Tropsch
The Fischer–Tropsch process is a method to synthesize liquid hydrocarbons, including alkanes, from carbon monoxide and hydrogen. This method is used to produce substitutes for petroleum distillates.

Laboratory preparation
There is usually little need for alkanes to be synthesized in the laboratory, since they are usually commercially available. Also, alkanes are generally unreactive chemically or biologically, and do not undergo functional group interconversions cleanly. When alkanes are produced in the laboratory, it is often a side-product of a reaction. For example, the use of n-butyllithium as a strong base gives the conjugate acid n-butane as a side-product:

 

However, at times it may be desirable to make a section of a molecule into an alkane-like functionality (alkyl group) using the above or similar methods. For example, an ethyl group is an alkyl group; when this is attached to a hydroxy group, it gives ethanol, which is not an alkane. To do so, the best-known methods are hydrogenation of alkenes:

  (R = alkyl)

Alkanes or alkyl groups can also be prepared directly from alkyl halides in the Corey–House–Posner–Whitesides reaction. The Barton–McCombie deoxygenation removes hydroxyl groups from alcohols e.g.

and the Clemmensen reduction removes carbonyl groups from aldehydes and ketones to form alkanes or alkyl-substituted compounds e.g.:

Preparation from other organic compounds

Alkanes can be prepared from a variety of organic compounds. These include alkenes, alkynes, haloalkanes, alcohols, aldehydes, ketones and carboxylic acids.

From alkenes and alkynes

Addition of molecular hydrogen across the π bond(s) of alkenes and alkynes gives alkanes. This hydrogenation reaction is typically performed using a powdered metal catalyst, such as palladium, platinum, or nickel. The reaction is exothermic because the product alkane is more stable. This is an important process in several fields of industrial and research chemistry.

From haloalkanes

Several methods produce alkanes from haloalkanes.

In the Wurtz reaction, a haloalkane is treated with sodium in dry ether to yield an alkane having double the number of carbon atoms. This reaction proceeds through a free radical intermediate and has the possibility of alkene formation in case of tertiary haloalkanes and vicinal dihalides.

2 R−X + 2 Na → R−R + 2 Na+X

In Corey–House synthesis, a haloalkane is treated with dialkyl lithium cuprate, a Gilman reagent, to yield a higher alkane:

Li+[R–Cu–R]– + R'–X → R–R' + R–Cu + Li+X

Haloalkanes can be reduced to alkanes by reaction with hydride reagents such as lithium aluminium hydride.

 R−X + H– → R−H + X–

Applications
The applications of alkanes depend on the number of carbon atoms. The first four alkanes are used mainly for heating and cooking purposes, and in some countries for electricity generation. Methane and ethane are the main components of natural gas; they are normally stored as gases under pressure. It is, however, easier to transport them as liquids: This requires both compression and cooling of the gas.

Propane and butane are gases at atmospheric pressure that can be liquefied at fairly low pressures and are commonly known as liquified petroleum gas (LPG). Propane is used in propane gas burners and as a fuel for road vehicles, butane in space heaters and disposable cigarette lighters. Both are used as propellants in aerosol sprays.

From pentane to octane the alkanes are highly volatile liquids. They are used as fuels in internal combustion engines, as they vaporize easily on entry into the combustion chamber without forming droplets, which would impair the uniformity of the combustion. Branched-chain alkanes are preferred as they are much less prone to premature ignition, which causes knocking, than their straight-chain homologues. This propensity to premature ignition is measured by the octane rating of the fuel, where 2,2,4-trimethylpentane (isooctane) has an arbitrary value of 100, and heptane has a value of zero. Apart from their use as fuels, the middle alkanes are also good solvents for nonpolar substances.

Alkanes from nonane to, for instance, hexadecane (an alkane with sixteen carbon atoms) are liquids of higher viscosity, less and less suitable for use in gasoline. They form instead the major part of diesel and aviation fuel. Diesel fuels are characterized by their cetane number, cetane being an old name for hexadecane. However, the higher melting points of these alkanes can cause problems at low temperatures and in polar regions, where the fuel becomes too thick to flow correctly.

Alkanes from hexadecane upwards form the most important components of fuel oil and lubricating oil. In the latter function, they work at the same time as anti-corrosive agents, as their hydrophobic nature means that water cannot reach the metal surface. Many solid alkanes find use as paraffin wax, for example, in candles. This should not be confused however with true wax, which consists primarily of esters.

Alkanes with a chain length of approximately 35 or more carbon atoms are found in bitumen, used, for example, in road surfacing. However, the higher alkanes have little value and are usually split into lower alkanes by cracking.

Some synthetic polymers such as polyethylene and polypropylene are alkanes with chains containing hundreds or thousands of carbon atoms. These materials are used in innumerable applications, and billions of kilograms of these materials are made and used each year.

Environmental transformations

Alkanes are chemically very inert apolar molecules which are not very reactive as organic compounds.  This inertness yields serious ecological issues if they are released into the environment. Due to their lack of functional groups and low water solubility, alkanes show poor bioavailability for microorganisms.

There are, however, some microorganisms possessing the metabolic capacity to utilize n-alkanes as both carbon and energy sources. Some bacterial species are highly specialised in degrading alkanes; these are referred to as hydrocarbonoclastic bacteria.

Hazards

Methane is flammable, explosive and dangerous to inhale; because it is a colorless, odorless gas, special caution must be taken around methane. Ethane is also extremely flammable, explosive, and dangerous to inhale. Both of them may cause suffocation. Propane, too, is flammable and explosive, and may cause drowsiness or unconsciousness if inhaled. Butane presents the same hazards as propane.

Alkanes also pose a threat to the environment. Branched alkanes have a lower biodegradability than unbranched alkanes. Methane is considered to be the greenhouse gas that is most dangerous to the environment, although the amount of methane in the atmosphere is relatively low. As of April, 2022, atmospheric methane concentrations were around 1910 ppb.

See also

 Alkene
 Alkyne
 Cycloalkane
 Higher alkanes
 Aliphatic compound

References

Further reading
 Virtual Textbook of Organic Chemistry
 A visualization of the crystal structures of alkanes up to nonan

 
Hydrocarbons